Eric Tai (born August 23, 1984) is a Tongan-born Filipino actor, model, TV host, comedian, professional Arena of Valor esports player, and former rugby union player who played for the Alabang Eagles and represented the Philippines national rugby union team in 15s and 7s. He was also one of the hosts of It's Showtime, where he went by the screen name Eruption.

Early life
Tai spent his childhood in New Zealand. In high school, he became involved in various sports such as rugby, cricket, volleyball, and track and field.

Tai first came to the Philippines as a missionary for the Church of Jesus Christ of Latter-day Saints where he was able to serve a 2-year mission in Naga, Camarines Sur.

Rugby career
Tai was part of the Philippines national rugby union team in 2011. For two years he did not play for the national team. In 2013, he made his return to the national team. In club rugby, Tai played for the Alabang Eagles.

Career
Before his stint in the Philippines, he was already pursuing a career in acting, commercial modelling, and hosting in Australia.

Television
He made a guest appearance in It's Showtime as a hurado or a judge in a segment of the variety show and also made a dance exhibition. In 2012, he became a full-time host on the show and became known under the screen name Eruption. He was offered to be part of various other television shows on ABS-CBN but declined saying that he wanted to focus with It's Showtime.

As part of McCann Erickson's "Everybody Break Now" advertising campaign for KitKat, Tai portrayed Dan, the Breakinator in a television commercial for the chocolate brand.

He took a break after his stint in a Canadian tour of It's Showtime in September 2014 and returned in December the same year.

Tai announced his departure from It's Showtime in early 2016. Co-host Coleen Garcia also left. His last appearance on the television show was in December 2015.

Tai along with his wife, Rona Samson joined the fifth season of The Amazing Race Asia as contestants.

Tai is formerly part of the action adventure series Bagani in 2018, in which he played a giant guy. This was Tai's first teleserye, followed by his second teleserye Ngayon at Kailanman in 2019 in which he played a bodyguard.

Film
Tai appeared in Madaling Araw, Mahabang Gabi, an independent film which also featured Angelica Panganiban. In May 2012, Tai expressed his desire to act in an action film but said he did not find any opportunity to do so in the Philippines.

Hosting 
Tai hosted Mobile Legends: Bang Bang Southeast Asia Cup 2019 (MSC 2019) held at the Smart Araneta Coliseum on June 21–23, 2018.

Modeling
Tai appeared on the cover of the first issue of the Philippine edition of Muscle & Fitness in 2016.

Personal life
Tai is married to Rona Samson. The two became engaged in August 2014 when Tai proposed to Samson in Albay. They got married in March 2015 at the Church of Jesus Christ of Latter-day Saints in Cubao, Quezon City. They got involved in a second marriage ceremony in May 2016. In 2015, Samson experienced a miscarriage and was informed by her doctor that she could only conceive a child with Tai through In vitro fertilisation. This led to the couple joining The Amazing Race Asia who planned to use the prize money to go through with the procedure. Tai also said that his esports events paid him well and helped him through the process.

Video games is also a hobby of Tai which according to his wife proved beneficial for their stint in The Amazing Race. She said this hobby helped them in the puzzle solving aspect of the reality show.

Filmography

Television

Film
Shake Rattle & Roll 14 (2012)
Madaling Araw, Mahabang Gabi (independent film; 2012)
The Last Soldier (2019)

References

1984 births
Living people
Tongan actors
Tongan rugby union players
Philippines international rugby union players
Star Magic
Mormon missionaries in the Philippines
ABS-CBN personalities
Filipino television variety show hosts
The Amazing Race contestants
Tongan expatriates in the Philippines
Filipino esports players
Twitch (service) streamers